is a Shinto shrine in the Sannomiyamachi neighborhood of the city of  Hakusan in Ishikawa Prefecture, Japan. It is the ichinomiya of former Kaga Province. The main festival of the shrine is held annually on May 6. It is the head shrine of approximately 2000 "Hakusan Jinja" across Japan.  Though read differently, "Shirayama" and "Hakusan" use the same characters (白山) in Japanese.

Enshrined kami
The kami enshrined at Shirayamahime Jinja are:
 , also known as Kukurihime, the deified Hakusan volcano
 , the creator god
 , the creator goddess

History
The Shirayamahime Jinja is located at the foot of 2702 meter Mount Hakusan, a sacred mountain on the border of Ishikawa and Gifu Prefectures. The shrine consists of the "Hakusan Hongū" or Shimo-Hakusan, located at the foot of the mountain, and the "Oku-no-miya" located at the summit of the Gozengamine peak of the mountain. The origins of Shirayamahime Jinja are unknown. The mountain has been an object of worship from prehistoric times, and one of the Three Holy Mountains of Japan. Although there is no documentary evidence, the shrine claims that it was first established by the legendary Kofun period Emperor Sujin (reigned 97 BC – 30 BC) and was rebuilt in 716 by Empress Genshō. The shugendō monk Taichō is said to have been the first person to reach the summit in 717, and to have built a chapel there. However, the first appearance of the shrine in historical documentation is an entry date 853 in the Nihon Montoku Tennō Jitsuroku, in which it was granted third court rank. At some point in the mid-Heian period, the shrine came to be regarded as the ichinomiya of the province. During the Kamakura and early Muromachi periods the shrine prospered greatly as in collaboration with Zen Buddhism, Hakusan shrines were established at many locations around the country. However, this prosperity came to an end with the Kaga ikki in 1455. During this rebellion, the shrine lost its estates and revenues and in 1480 the shrine, which was located on the banks of the Tedori River at the time, was destroyed by fire. It remained in ruins for over a century.  

The shrine was restored by Maeda Toshiie, daimyō of Kaga Domain under the Tokugawa shogunate in the early Edo period, and continued to grow and prosper with the patronage of the Maeda clan until the Meiji Restoration. During the Meiji period era of State Shinto, the shrine was designated as a  under the Modern system of ranked Shinto shrines.

See also
List of Shinto shrines
Ichinomiya

References

External links

Beppyo shrines
Shinto shrines in Ishikawa Prefecture
Kaga Province
Hakusan, Ishikawa
Ichinomiya